Bessie Bryant Stinson (December 24, 1902 – July 19, 1996) was an American politician and businesswoman.

Born in Hammon, Rogers Mills County, Oklahoma Territory, Stinson went to the University of Oklahoma and Draughon's Business College in Clinton, Oklahoma. In 1938, Stinson moved to Phoenix, Arizona. She worked in financial and business offices of various businesses in Arizona and Oklahoma. During World War II, Stinson served in the Women's Army Corps. She was involved in the Republican Party. From 1976 to 1971, Stinson served in the Arizona House of Representatives. Then, she served in the Arizona State Senate from 1971 to 1975. Stinson died in Elk City, Oklahoma in 1996.

Notes

1902 births
1996 deaths
People from Hammon, Oklahoma
Politicians from Phoenix, Arizona
Military personnel from Oklahoma
University of Oklahoma alumni
Women in the United States Army
Businesspeople from Arizona
Businesspeople from Oklahoma
Women state legislators in Arizona
Republican Party members of the Arizona House of Representatives
Republican Party Arizona state senators
20th-century American women politicians
20th-century American politicians
20th-century American businesspeople
Politicians from Oklahoma